Shahabad may refer to:

India
 Shahabad Markanda, a town in Kurukshetra, Haryana, India
 Shahabad, Gulbarga, a town in Karnataka, India
 Shahabad, Hardoi, a town in Uttar Pradesh, India
 Shahabad (Lok Sabha constituency)
 Shahabad, Rampur, a town in Uttar Pradesh, India
 Shahabad, now Arrah, city in Bihar, India
 Shahabad District, former district of Bihar, India
 Shahabad, Alwar, a village in Alwar, India

Iran

East Azerbaijan Province
 Shah Abad-e-Mashayekh, a village in Tabriz County

Golestan Province
 Shahabad-e Parsah Su, a village in Golestan Province, Iran

Hamadan Province
 Shahabad, Hamadan, a village in Hamadan Province, Iran

Isfahan Province
 Shahabad, Isfahan, a village in Isfahan County
 Shahabad, Kuhpayeh, a village in Isfahan County

Kerman Province
 Shahabad, Fahraj, a village in Fahraj County
 Shahabad, Kerman, a village in Kerman County
 Shahabad, Rudbar-e Jonubi, a village in Rudbar-e Jonubi County
 Shahabad, Sirjan, a village in Sirjan County

Kermanshah Province
 Shahabad, Kermanshah, a city in Kermanshah Province, Iran

Khuzestan Province
 Shahabad-e Sadat, a village in Lali County

Lorestan Province
 Shahabad, Lorestan, a village in Lorestan Province, Iran
 Shahabad, alternate name of Eslamabad, Besharat, a village in Lorestan Province, Iran

Mazandaran Province
 Shahabad, Mazandaran, a city in Mazandaran Province, Iran

North Khorasan Province
 Shahabad, alternate name of Behkadeh-ye Razavi, a village in North Khorasan Province, Iran
 Shahabad, alternate name of Eslamabad-e Kord, a village in North Khorasan Province, Iran
 Shahabad-e Khavar, a village in North Khorasan Province, Iran

Razavi Khorasan Province
 Shahabad, Razavi Khorasan
 Shahabad-e Arab, a village in Razavi Khorasan Province, Iran
 Shahabad, alternate name of Eslamabad-e Lakazi, a village in Razavi Khorasan Province, Iran

Sistan and Baluchestan Province
 Shahabar, Sistan and Baluchestan, a village in Qasr-e Qand County

South Khorasan Province
 Khezri Dasht Beyaz, formerly Shahabad, a city in South Khorasan Province, Iran
 Shahabad, alternate name of Dastgerd, Birjand, a village in South Khorasan Province, Iran
Shahabad, Tabas, a village in Tabas County

Tehran Province
 Shahabad, Tehran, a village in Qods County

West Azerbaijan Province
 Shahabad, Miandoab, a village in Miandoab County